Andrew Raynes (born 7 April 1973), commonly known as "Stumpy", is an English former strongman, powerlifter, and bodybuilder. He was a multiple time finalist in Britain's Strongest Man and a finalist of the 2001 World's Strongest Man contest.

Career
Raynes began competing in bodybuilding as a junior competitor in 1990, winning the NABBA Junior Mr. Northeast contest in 1990 and again in 1994. He would also go on to win the NABBA Junior Mr. Britain contest in 1994. Raynes won the 1998 NABBA Mr. England overall title, and the Mr. Universe Amateur title in the short class in 1998 & 1999.

Raynes competed in the World Powerlifting Congress organization, winning the WPC Junior British Powerlifting Championships as well as the WPC Junior European Powerlifting Championships in 1995. He would also go on to win the WPC British Powerlifting Championships in 1996.

Raynes began competing in strongman in 2000, competing in both Britain's Strongest Man and the IFSA China Grand Prix.

Raynes also went on to compete in both Britain's Strongest Man and England's Strongest Man over the next several years. He was a finalist at the 2001 World's Strongest Man contest, finishing in 10th place overall.

Raynes was trained by 1989 World's Strongest Man winner Jamie Reeves at his gym in Sheffield. His sporting heroes are Bill Kazmaier, Jon Pall Sigmarsson and Mike Tyson.

Personal records
Squat – 380 kg
Deadlift – 370 kg
Log Lift – 165 kg
Apollon's Axle – 175 kg

References

English bodybuilders
English strength athletes
British powerlifters
Male bodybuilders
1973 births
Living people